Milü ("close ratio"), also known as Zulü (Zu's ratio), is the name given to an approximation to  (pi) found by Chinese mathematician and astronomer Zu Chongzhi in the 5th century.

(If you subtract the second fraction from the first, you get ). For eight,  is needed.

A property of continued fractions is that truncating the expansion of a given number at any point will give the "best rational approximation" to the number. To obtain Milü, truncate the continued fraction expansion of  immediately before the term 292; that is,  is approximated by the finite continued fraction , which is equivalent to Milü. Since 292 is an unusually large term in a continued fraction expansion (corresponding to the next truncation introducing only a very small term, to the overall fraction), this convergent will be especially close to the true value of :

An easy mnemonic helps memorize this useful fraction by writing down each of the first three odd numbers twice: , then dividing the decimal number represented by the last 3 digits by the decimal number given by the first three digits. Alternatively, 

Zu Chongzhi's approximation  ≈  can be obtained with He Chengtian's method.

See also 
History of approximations of 
Pi Approximation Day

References

External links
Fractional Approximations of Pi

Pi
History of mathematics
History of science and technology in China
Chinese mathematical discoveries
Chinese words and phrases
Approximations
Rational numbers